Rufus Charles Ligon (May 6, 1903 – September 24, 1992) was an American Negro league pitcher in the 1930s and 1940s.

A native of Cameron, Texas, Ligon made his Negro leagues debut in 1932 with the Little Rock Grays and in 1944 played with the Memphis Red Sox. He played for Memphis again the following season. He died in Dunlay, Texas in 1992 at age 89.

References

External links
 and Seamheads

1903 births
1992 deaths
Little Rock Grays players
Memphis Red Sox players
Baseball pitchers
Baseball players from Texas
People from Cameron, Texas
20th-century African-American sportspeople